is a former Japanese football player.

Playing career
Ota was born in Shizuoka on July 19, 1970. After graduating from Shimizu Commercial High School, he joined Fujitsu in 1989. However he could not play at all in the match. In 1990, he moved to Toyota Motors. However he could hardly play in the match. In 1992, he moved to new club Shimizu S-Pulse based in his local. He played many matches as midfielder from 1993. However his opportunity to play decreased in 1995. In 1996, he moved to Japan Football League (JFL) club Consadole Sapporo. The club won the champions in 1997 and was promoted to J1 League. In 1999, he moved to Japan Football League club Jatco (later Jatco TT). He retired end of 2001 season.

Club statistics

References

External links

geocities.co.jp

1970 births
Living people
Association football people from Shizuoka Prefecture
Japanese footballers
Japan Soccer League players
J1 League players
Japan Football League (1992–1998) players
Japan Football League players
Kawasaki Frontale players
Nagoya Grampus players
Shimizu S-Pulse players
Hokkaido Consadole Sapporo players
Jatco SC players
Association football midfielders